Epaphrodita lobivertex is a species of praying mantis, native to Hispaniola, that was first described in 2004.

References

Mantidae
Mantodea of North America
Insects of the Caribbean
Fauna of Hispaniola
Insects described in 2004